Tanna may refer to:

Places
 Tanna (island), an island in Vanuatu
 Tanna, Germany, a city in Thuringia
 Tanna, former name of city of Thane in India

People
 Tanna, singular form of tannaim, a Rabbinic sage recorded in the Mishna
 Tanna, a last name common among Lohanas
 Christian Tanna, a member of the rock band I Mother Earth
 Dan Tanna, fictional character, in the TV series Vega$ (1978–1981)
 Jagori Tanna, a member of the rock band I Mother Earth, brother of Christian

Other
 Tanna, an Old High German word meaning oak from which the word tannin is derived
 Tanna (film), a 2015 film set on the island of Tanna, Vanuatu 
 Tanna languages, a subgroup of the South Vanuatu languages

See also
 Tana (disambiguation)
 Tanna (cicada), a genus of cicadas
 Tanna fruit dove, a bird endemic to Vanuatu
 Tanna ground dove, an extinct bird endemic to Vanuatu
 Tanna ornatipes, a genus of jumping spiders, synonym of Araneotanna